Robert William Scott (13 July 1887 – 4 February 1957) was an Australian rules footballer who played with Richmond in the Victorian Football League (VFL).

Notes

External links 

1887 births
1957 deaths
Australian rules footballers from Melbourne
Richmond Football Club players
People from Chelsea, Victoria